Na h-Eileanan Iasgaich  comprise a small uninhabited archipelago in Loch Boisdale, in the south east of the island of South Uist, in the Outer Hebrides, Scotland. The individual islands are separated from one another at high tide, but connected to one another at low tide, (although not to their much larger neighbour of South Uist). They are around 50 ha in extent and over 20m at their highest point. Their boundaries are ill-defined.

Geography and geology
The islands have a thin soil and a Lewisian gneiss bedrock.

Their name means "fishing islands" in Scottish Gaelic because they increase greatly in size at low tide, creating a number of fish traps and homes for edible crustaceans.

There are five main islands in the group -
  — Great fishing island
  — Middling fishing island
  — Little fishing island
 
 .

Notes and references

Uist islands
Uninhabited islands of the Outer Hebrides
Landforms of the Outer Hebrides
Archipelagoes of Scotland